Neraysho Kasanwirjo (born 18 February 2002) is a Dutch professional footballer who plays as a defender for Eredivisie club Feyenoord.

Club career

Ajax
Born in Amsterdam, Kasanwirjo started playing in the youth ranks of Zeeburgia before being scouted and joining the Ajax Youth Academy at the age of nine. Progressing through the ranks, he made his professional debut in the Dutch Eerste Divisie, the second tier of professional football in the Netherlands, playing for Jong Ajax, the reserves team of Ajax. On 19 August 2019, Kasanwirjo made his debut against N.E.C. in a 3–3 draw.

Groningen
On 10 May 2021, it was announced that FC Groningen had signed Kasanwirjo on a three-year contract, joining the club for the 2021–22 season after his contract with Ajax had ended.

Feyenoord
On 20 January 2023, Feyenoord announced that it had reached a deal with FC Groningen for the transfer of Kasanwirjo, with the player signing a contract for four and a half years.

International career
Born in the Netherlands, Kasanwirjo is of Surinamese and Indonesian descent. He is a youth international for the Netherlands.

Career statistics

Notes

Honours
Netherlands U17
UEFA European Under-17 Championship: 2019

References

External links
 
 Career stats & Profile - Voetbal International

2002 births
Living people
Footballers from Amsterdam
Dutch footballers
Dutch sportspeople of Surinamese descent
Dutch people of Indonesian descent
Association football defenders
Netherlands youth international footballers
Netherlands under-21 international footballers
A.V.V. Zeeburgia players
AFC Ajax players
Jong Ajax players
FC Groningen players
Feyenoord players
Eerste Divisie players
Eredivisie players